KCWX, virtual channel 2 (VHF digital channel 5), is a MyNetworkTV-affiliated television station licensed to Fredericksburg, Texas, United States. Although Fredericksburg is within the Austin DMA, the station is officially assigned by Nielsen to the larger San Antonio market, and its signal covers the San Antonio and Bexar County area. The station is owned by Austin-based Corridor Television and maintains main studios in Austin on West Avenue. Its main transmitter is located on the Gillespie–Kendall county line.

Since its sign-on in 2000, KCWX's history has straddled the San Antonio and Austin markets; since 2006, it has only held a network affiliation in the San Antonio market.

History

The long road to construction

The availability of a VHF station that could potentially serve two media markets attracted attention. In June 1987, the FCC designated twelve applicants for comparative hearing. Some of the applicants, notably the Telemundo network, dropped out in the months following the hearing designation order. Administrative law judge Edward Luton made his initial decision on who should be granted the channel out of six contenders in June 1989; he selected Stonewall Television, owned by Marquis Whittington and Robert Simmons. The FCC's review board, however, overturned this decision in 1993 and gave the nod to Fredericksburg Channel 2, an applicant whose principal stakeholders were former San Antonio Spurs owner Red McCombs and Bob Roth, a former manager and son of the owner of KONO-TV channel 12 in San Antonio in the 1950s and 1960s.

As appeals continued on the 1993 decision, tragedy struck. On October 20, 1995, Roth took two executives from the Hearst Corporation to scout the area and view the proposed transmitter site. The car they were traveling in was involved in a head-on collision south of Stonewall; Roth died at the age of 73. No one was wearing seat belts at the time of the accident.

In 1996, Fredericksburg Channel 2 merged with one of its five competing applicants: Global Information Technologies of Austin, a company owned by Carmen and Saleem Tawil. The Tawils had previously built and sold a low-power independent TV station in Austin, K13VC. In August 1997, the FCC approved the combined application of Fredericksburg Channel 2 and Global and dismissed the other applicants, one of which, Frontier Broadcasting, challenged the dismissal in federal appeals court; Frontier had its application dismissed over transmitter site issues in 1989. With a construction permit in hand, the partnership, taking the name of Corridor Television, began building channel 2 in 1998. The call letters KBEJ, a sequential assignment, were given to the construction permit in May 1998.

As a UPN affiliate
As early as 1997, UPN was seen as the most likely affiliation for KBEJ to pursue. By 2000, the network had already experienced problems keeping an affiliate in both San Antonio and Austin. When it launched in 1995, the network was affiliated with KRRT channel 35 for the San Antonio market and the Hill Country Paramount Network, a chain of low-power TV stations, serving Austin. Both had been lost. Sinclair Broadcast Group, owner of KRRT, switched its UPN affiliates to The WB in a group deal announced in 1997, and UPN did not have a San Antonio affiliate after that time; KMOL-TV, the NBC affiliate that was co-owned with UPN itself by United Television, was airing the network in late-night hours. In 1998, UPN had dropped the Hill Country Paramount Network for K13VC on six days' notice because K13VC, unlike the previous affiliate, had cable carriage.

In addition to a UPN affiliation, Corridor contracted with Belo, which owned Austin's KVUE and San Antonio's KENS, to operate channel 2, which began broadcasting August 3, 2000. Belo provided management services from KENS and technical services from its headquarters in Dallas. In addition to UPN and syndicated programming, the star attraction of the new KBEJ was a package of 31 San Antonio Spurs games; that year, KENS and KBEJ had won the rights to the Spurs from their previous carriers, KSAT and KRRT.

Cable carriage proved to be a difficulty at the outset for KBEJ. Before launch, and even as transmitter tests were being conducted, the FCC had yet to rule on which market the new station, equidistant from San Antonio and Austin, was to be placed in. The original designation was Austin, but it would take the new channel longer to find cable carriage there than in San Antonio, where it was added by Time Warner Cable on October 28, right before the start of the NBA season. It was not until August 2, 2001, that KBEJ made an appearance on Time Warner Cable's Austin system after pressure from viewers and an agreement with Belo.

By the time Austin cable viewers could get KBEJ, however, the Spurs had soured on channel 2. Residents of the south side of San Antonio, further away from Fredericksburg, complained of signal difficulties. The transmitter was located to the north of the city, whereas the other stations were to its south. The Spurs had averaged an 8.5 rating on KRRT in the 1999–2000 season; by February 2001, they were pulling a 5.5 on KBEJ, whereas ratings for KENS games held steady. Before the 2001–2002 season, the Spurs moved back to KRRT, even though KBEJ had held a multi-year contract for the games.

As a CW affiliate

On January 24, 2006, the Warner Bros. unit of Time Warner and CBS Corporation announced that the two companies would shut down The WB and UPN and combine the networks' respective programming to create a new fifth network, The CW. On March 28, Corridor Television signed an agreement to make KBEJ San Antonio's CW affiliate. Three weeks later, on April 18, The CW announced it had affiliated with Austin's WB affiliate, KNVA. On April 7, 2006, KBEJ changed to KCWX, reflecting its new affiliation.

With The CW boasting affiliates for both San Antonio and Austin, KCWX became a San Antonio-market station exclusively. Soon after The CW launched on September 18, 2006, Time Warner Cable began blacking out CW programming on KCWX in the Austin market, as KNVA owner LIN TV Corporation claimed syndication exclusivity for KNVA on October 2. Time Warner continued to carry KCWX's non-network programming until April 3, 2007, when Time Warner Cable officially dropped KCWX from its Austin channel lineup.

Switch to MyNetworkTV
In Sinclair Broadcast Group's annual report for 2009, released in March 2010, the company disclosed that it had signed the month before an affiliation agreement to move the CW affiliation to its San Antonio MyNetworkTV affiliate KMYS on September 1, 2010. The affiliation switch was eventually moved up two days to August 30; on that date, the MyNetworkTV affiliation moved to KCWX. With the then-pending loss of its CW affiliation, Belo terminated its LMA with Corridor Television on April 24, 2010, forcing Corridor to operate KCWX on its own.

In addition to the MyNetworkTV schedule, syndicated programs currently broadcast by KCWX include The Real, 25 Words or Less, The Goldbergs, Friends, and Murdoch Mysteries, among others. KCWX also airs movies sourced from the This TV lineup.

Technical information

Subchannels
The station's digital signal is multiplexed:

Analog-to-digital conversion
Because it was granted an original construction permit after the FCC finalized the DTV allotment plan on April 21, 1997, the station did not receive a companion channel for a digital television station. Instead, on June 12, 2009, which was the end of the digital television conversion period for full-service stations, KCWX was required to turn off its analog signal and turn on its digital signal. The station flash-cut its digital signal into operation on VHF channel 5; as it chose that allocation as its final digital channel selection, it had to wait for CBS affiliate KENS to shut down its analog signal before KCWX could bring its digital signal online, using PSIP to display the station's virtual channel as its former VHF analog channel 2.

In late May 2009, in a filing with the FCC, Belo/Corridor stated that it would not have KCWX's digital signal ready to sign-on on June 12, instead expecting it to be ready on July 10 due to weather delays. Cable subscribers continued to view the station via a direct fiber connection of KCWX from KENS to the Time Warner Cable headend. Corridor/Belo was able to negotiate with the tower installer to finish the construction of the tower earlier than expected; KCWX's digital signal finally signed on the air on July 1, 2009. The signal reaches south of San Antonio and southeast to Nixon, north to Lampasas and west to Junction.

Since KCWX operates on a low-band VHF channel, an application has been filed with the FCC to increase the station's effective radiated power from 23.7 kW to 82.9 kW as well as an application to launch a fill-in digital translator that would broadcast on VHF channel 8 in the immediate part of San Antonio. KCWX also re-broadcasts on a digital translator in Austin on VHF channel 8.

References

External links
 
 

MyNetworkTV affiliates
This TV affiliates
Bounce TV affiliates
Decades (TV network) affiliates
Television channels and stations established in 2000
Television stations in San Antonio
2000 establishments in Texas